Generale d'Armata (literally: Field Army General) is a former Italian military rank equating to a "full general" (see General Officer).

See also
Italian Army Ranks

Military ranks of Italy